Lee Township, Ohio, may refer to:
Lee Township, Athens County, Ohio
Lee Township, Carroll County, Ohio
Lee Township, Monroe County, Ohio

Ohio township disambiguation pages